These are tables of congressional delegations from Nevada to the United States Senate and United States House of Representatives. Nevada's current U.S Senators are Democrats Catherine Cortez Masto (serving since 2017) and Jacky Rosen (serving since 2019). Nevada has been allotted 4 seats in the U.S House of Representatives since the 2010 census; currently, 3 of the seats are held by Democrats, and the last seat is held by a Republican.

The current dean of the Nevada delegation is Representative Mark Amodei (NV-2), having served in the House since 2011.

United States Senate

U.S. House of Representatives

Delegates from Nevada Territory

Members from Nevada

1863–1983: 1 at-large seat

1983–present: election by district

Key

See also

List of United States congressional districts
Nevada's congressional districts
Political party strength in Nevada

References

Politics of Nevada
Nevada
 
 
Congressional delegations